European Film Academy member Ingvar Thordarson is one of Europes most prolific film producers.

Mr. Thordarson has produced 24 features, tv-series, and documentaries, which have accumulated multiple awards all over the world and been commercially successful. Among them: The Discovery Award at the Toronto International Film Festival (TIFF), the Critics Award at Cannes Film Festival. Various titles include: 101 Reykjavík, The Bothersome Man, Life in a Fishbowl; the winner of a record 12 awards at the Icelandic Edda Film Awards and The Grump, Finland's highest-grossing film in 2014. Also, the award-winning Tom of Finland and the box-office champion Unknown soldier, sold over one million tickets in Finland alone. Mr. Thordarson is now working on the TV series, Wall of Wounds, with Warner Bros., directed by Andreas Prochaska

Within the industry, Mr. Thordarson is known for producing in the most inclement of arctic environments.

Mr. Thordarson is also a guest lecturer at the London Film School and the University of Exeter, where he contributes to the MA International Film Business courses.

For the past several decades, Mr. Thordarson has been a vigorous contributor to the European cultural scene. He was active for several years as a cinema and theater manager and was the founder of Iceland's first and only outdoor drive-in cinema. As a promoter, Mr. Thordarson has been instrumental in engaging such groundbreaking artists as David Bowie, Sting, Richard O'Brien, Eddie Izzard, Prodigy, and Pet Shop Boys, just to name a few.

Filmography 
2021 The Wait (co-producer)
2020 The Last Fishing Trip (Associate Producer)
2019 From Iceland to Eden (co-producer)
2019 9 out of 10 (Producer)
2019 Tuntematon sotilas 
2018 Let me Fall, the second biggest box office movie in the Icelandic history. (producer)
2017 Unknown Soldier (co-producer).
2017 Tom of Finland (co-producer).
2017 The Mysteries of Greenland (producer).
2016 Reykjavik (producer).
2016 The Mine (co-producer).
2015 The Midwife.
2015 Albatross.
2014 Grump (co-producer).
2014 Live in a Fishbowl (producer). 
2014 Mielensäpahoittaja ja miniä (co-producer).
2014 Albatross (producer).
2014 Life in a Fishbowl (producer).
2014 Grandad (producer).
2013 Autumn Blood (co-producer).
2013 Þetta Reddast (producer).
2012 Frost (producer).
2012 Santa's Night Out (producer).
2011 Mona (producer).
2011 Þetta Reddast (producer).
2010 Órói (producer).
2009 Reykjavik Whale Watching Massacre (producer).
2009 Hótel Jörð (short film) (producer).
2008 Dark Floors (co-producer - as Ingvar Thordarson).
2007 Astrópía (producer).
2006 Vandræðamaðurinn/The Troublesome Man (co-producer).
2006 Huldufólk 102 (documentary) (co-producer).
2005 Strákarnir okkar (producer).
2000 101 Reykjavík (producer).
1998 Popp í Reykjavík (documentary) (producer - as Ingvar H. Þórðarson).
1992 Sodoma Reykjavik.

References

Kisi Production - http://www.kisi.is
Neutrinos Productions - http://www.neutrinosproductions.com

External links

Living people
Ingvar Thordarson
Year of birth missing (living people)